Arnauti may refer to:
 Arnauts (Arnauti in Balkan Slavic languages), Ottoman-era ethnonym of Albanians
 Arnauti (Zenica), a village in Bosnia and Herzegovina
 Arnauti, Bulgaria, a village in Bulgaria, known after 1934 as Paisiy
 Abdul-Kader Arnauti, 20th-century Albanian scholar

See also 
 Arnaouti, an islet in Greece